The Forty Martyrs of Sebaste or the Holy Forty (Ancient/Katharevousa Greek Ἅγιοι Τεσσεράκοντα; Demotic: Άγιοι Σαράντα) were a group of Roman soldiers in the Legio XII Fulminata (Armed with Lightning) whose martyrdom in the year 320 for the Christian faith is recounted in traditional martyrologies.

They were killed near the city of Sebaste, in Lesser Armenia (present-day Sivas in Turkey), victims of the persecutions of Licinius who, after 316, persecuted the Christians of the East. The earliest account of their existence and martyrdom is given by Bishop Basil of Caesarea (370–379) in a homily he delivered on their feast day. The Feast of the Forty Martyrs is thus older than Basil himself, who eulogised them only fifty or sixty years after their deaths.

Martyrdom

According to Basil, forty soldiers who had openly confessed themselves Christians were condemned by the prefect to be exposed naked upon a frozen pond near Sebaste on a bitterly cold night, that they might freeze to death. Among the confessors, one yielded and, leaving his companions, sought the warm baths near the lake which had been prepared for any who might prove inconstant.  Upon immersion into the cauldron, the one who yielded went into shock and immediately died. One of the guards, Aglaius, was set to keep watch over the martyrs and beheld at this moment a supernatural brilliancy overshadowing them. He at once proclaimed himself a Christian, threw off his garments, and joined the remaining thirty-nine. Thus the number of forty remained complete. At daybreak, the stiffened bodies of the confessors, which still showed signs of life, were burned and the ashes cast into a river. Christians, however, collected the precious remains, and the relics were distributed throughout many cities; in this way, veneration of the Forty Martyrs became widespread, and numerous churches were erected in their honour.

Names

The Menaion of the Eastern Orthodox Church lists the names of the Forty Martyrs as follows:
Hesychius, Meliton, Heraclius, Smaragdus, Domnus, Eunoicus, Valens, Vivianus, Claudius, Priscus, Theodulus, Euthychius, John, Xantheas, Helianus, Sisinius, Cyrion, Angius, Aetius, Flavius, Acacius, Ecditius, Lysimachus, Alexander, Elias, Candidus, Theophilus, Dometian, Gaius, Gorgonius, Eutyches, Athanasius, Cyril, Sacerdon, Nicholas, Valaerius, Philoctimon, Severian, Chudion, and Aglaius.

According to Antonio Borrelli, their names were:
Aetius, Eutychius, Cyrius, Theophilus, Sisinnius, Smaragdus, Candidus, Aggia, Gaius, Cudio, Heraclius, John, Philotemon, Gorgonius, Cirillus, Severianus, Theodulus, Nicallus, Flavius, Xantius, Valerius, Aesychius, Eunoicus, Domitian, Domninus, Helianus, Leontius (Theoctistus), Valens, Acacius, Alexander, Vicratius (Vibianus), Priscus, Sacerdos, Ecdicius, Athanasius, Lisimachus, Claudius, Ile, Melito and Eutychus (Aglaius).

Veneration

Early
A church was built at Caesarea, in Cappadocia, and it was in this church that Basil publicly delivered his homily. Gregory of Nyssa was especially devoted to the Forty Martyrs; two discourses in praise of them, preached by him in the church dedicated to them, are still preserved and upon the death of his parents, he laid them to rest beside the relics of the confessors. Ephrem the Syrian has also eulogized the Forty Martyrs. Sozomen, who was an eye-witness, has left an interesting account of the finding of the relics in Constantinople, in the shrine of Saint Thyrsus built by Caesarius, through the instrumentality of Empress Pulcheria.

In the East

The cult of the Forty Martyrs is widespread all over the East. The Forty Saints Monastery in Sarandë, modern day Albania, which gave its name in Greek to the city itself (Άγιοι Σαράντα, Hagioi Saranda), was built in the 6th century AD, and is thought to have been an important pilgrimage site. The Churches of St. Sophia in Ohrid (modern-day North Macedonia) and Kiev (Ukraine) contain their depictions, datable to the 11th and 12th centuries, respectively. A number of auxiliary chapels were dedicated to the Forty, and there are several instances when an entire temple (church building) is dedicated to them: for example Xeropotamou Monastery on Mount Athos and the 13th-century Holy Forty Martyrs Church, in Veliko Tarnovo, Bulgaria. Anna Komnene speaks of a Church of the 40 saints located in Constantinople, in the Alexiad. In 2013 the Feast of the Holy Forty Martyrs in Štip was inscribed in UNESCO Intangible Cultural Heritage Lists of North Macedonia.

In Syria, the Armenian Cathedral of Aleppo and the Greek Orthodox Cathedral of Homs are dedicated to the Forty Martyrs.

The feast day of the Forty Martyrs falls on March 9. In Orthodox Churches that follow the Julian calendar, this day is intentionally placed so that it will fall during Great Lent. There is an intentional play on the number forty being both the number of martyrs and the days in the fast. Their feast also falls during Great Lent so that the endurance of the martyrs will serve as an example to the faithful to persevere to the end (i.e., throughout the forty days of the fast) in order to attain heavenly reward (participation in Pascha, the Resurrection of Jesus).

There is a pious custom of baking “skylarks” (pastries shaped like skylarks) on this day, because people believed that birds sing at this time to announce the arrival of spring.

A prayer mentioning the Forty Holy Martyrs of Sebaste is also placed in the Orthodox Wedding Service (referred to as a "crowning") to remind the bride and groom that spiritual crowns await them in Heaven also if they remain as faithful to Christ as these saints of long ago.

In Orthodox art 

Byzantine artists were fascinated with the subject that allowed them to graphically show human despair. The Martyrs were typically represented at the point when they were about to freeze to death, "shivering from the cold, hugging themselves for warmth, or clasping hands to their faces or wrists in pain and despair". This is particularly evident in the large 10th-century ivory plaque from the Bode Museum and the Palaiologan portable mosaic set in wax, from Dumbarton Oaks.

The subject remains popular among Orthodox iconographers.

In the West
Special devotion to the Forty Martyrs of Sebaste was introduced at an early date into the West. Bishop Gaudentius of Brescia (d. about 410 or 427) received particles of the ashes of martyrs during a voyage in the East, and placed them with other relics in the altar of the basilica which he had erected, at the consecration of which he delivered a discourse, still extant. 

The Church of Santa Maria Antiqua in the Roman Forum, built in the fifth century, contains a chapel, built like the church itself on an ancient site, and consecrated to the Forty Martyrs. A sixth or seventh-century mural there depicts their martyrdom. The names of the confessors, as we find them also in later sources, were formerly inscribed on this fresco.

Acts of these martyrs, written subsequently, in Greek, Syriac and Latin, are yet extant, also a "Testament" of the Forty Martyrs.

See also
20,000 Martyrs of Nicomedia
42 Martyrs of Amorium
Forty Martyrs of England and Wales

Further reading
Of the Forty Soldiers (Mar. 9) in "Ælfric's Lives of Saints", by Ælfric of Eynsham London, Pub. for the Early English text society, by N. Trübner & co. (1881).

References

External links

 40 Holy Martyrs of Sebaste - Eastern Orthodox icon and synaxarion

320 deaths
Groups of Christian martyrs of the Roman era
4th-century Christian martyrs
4th-century Romans
Intangible Cultural Heritage of Humanity